Flora Mure-Campbell, Marchioness of Hastings and 6th Countess of Loudoun (1780 – 8 January 1840) was a British peer, the second daughter of James Mure-Campbell, 5th Earl of Loudoun and Lady Flora Macleod.

She married Francis Rawdon-Hastings, 2nd Earl of Moira, later the Governor-General of India, Governor of Malta and Marquess of Hastings, on 12 July 1804 and with him had six children:

Lady Flora Elizabeth (1806–1839), died unmarried.
Hon. Francis George Augustus (1807–1807), died in infancy.
George Augustus Francis, styled Lord Rawdon, later Earl of Rawdon, later 2nd Marquess of Hastings (1808–1844)
Lady Sophia Frederica Christina (1809–1859), married John Crichton-Stuart, 2nd Marquess of Bute and had issue.
Lady Selina Constance (1810–1867), married Charles Henry, of Straffan.
Lady Adelaide Augusta Lavinia (1812–1860), married Sir William Keith Murray.

Around 1807 she commissioned the building of Loudoun Castle in Ayrshire, to designs by Archibald Elliot.

This wish was complied with, and it now rests clasped with hers in the family vault at Loudoun Kirk.

References

Notes

Sources
 

1780 births
1840 deaths
British marchionesses
Loudoun, Flora Mure-Campbell, 6th Countess of
Loudoun, Flora Mure-Campbell, 6th Countess of
18th-century Scottish people
18th-century Scottish women
19th-century Scottish people
19th-century Scottish women
Hastings family
Earls of Loudoun
Wives of knights